Vengathur is a census town in Thiruvallur district in the Indian state of Tamil Nadu.

Demographics
 India census, Vengathur had a population of 17,003. Males constitute 51% of the population and females 49%. Vengathur has an average literacy rate of 78%, higher than the national average of 59.5%: male literacy is 84%, and female literacy is 72%. In Vengathur, 10% of the population is under 6 years of age.

References

Cities and towns in Tiruvallur district